Marvin's Room is a Canadian radio program, which airs on CBC Music. Hosted by A. Harmony, the program explores the genre of rhythm and blues, incorporating both historical and contemporary music in the genre.

The program premiered in July 2016 as a short-run summer series, hosted by the show's creator, Amanda Parris. Following the end of the show's original run, the CBC announced that the series would return as a permanent part of the network's regular schedule, beginning in November 2016.

The title was chosen because it symbolically connects the history and the future of the genre, linking Marvin Gaye's historic recording studio Marvin's Room with the contemporary Drake song "Marvins Room".

The series is also repeated on CBC Radio One in a weekend slot.

In November 2020, it was announced that the host, Amanda Parris, would leave the show temporarily on maternity leave. Music journalist and critic A. Harmony was named interim host in her absence.

In September 2022, Amanda Parris announced that she would be stepping down as host of Marvin's Room and that A. Harmony, who previously served as interim host, would join the show as its new permanent host.

A. Harmony's first episode as permanent host originally aired on September 16, 2022.

References

External links

CBC Music programs
Canadian music radio programs
2016 radio programme debuts
CBC Radio One programs